Santiago Oppenheimer Van Rhyn (23 May 1869 – ca. 1930) was the Mayor of Ponce, Puerto Rico in 1906. He was also a member of the House of Delegates of Puerto Rico.

Oppenheimer was born in Ponce on 23 May 1869. His parents were Carlos Juan Oppenheimer-Bettini and Ana Van Rhyn Mitchell. He married Isabel Fugurull and they had a son named Alfonso. There is a historic house in Ponce named Casa Oppenheimer.

Mayoral term
Several sources state that Oppenheimer was the Ponce mayor who received U.S. President Theodore Roosevelt during his trip to Puerto Rico on 21 November 1906.

Honors
In Ponce, there is a street in Urbanización Las Delicias of Barrio Magueyes named after Oppenheimer.

See also

 List of mayors of Ponce, Puerto Rico
 List of Puerto Ricans

Notes

Footnotes

References

Further reading
 Fay Fowlie de Flores. Ponce, Perla del Sur: Una Bibliográfica Anotada. Second Edition. 1997. Ponce, Puerto Rico: Universidad de Puerto Rico en Ponce. p. 244. Item 1240. 
 Luis Munoz Rivera. "Consummatum est." Obras Completas: prosa, febrero, 1889 - diciembre, 1890. San Juan, Puerto Rico: Instituto de Cultura Puertorriqueña.  pp. 154-157. (Colegio Universitario Tecnológico de Ponce, CUTPO).
 Fay Fowlie de Flores. Ponce, Perla del Sur: Una Bibliográfica Anotada. Second Edition. 1997. Ponce, Puerto Rico: Universidad de Puerto Rico en Ponce. p. 330. Item 1650. 
 Santiago Oppenheimer Bettini. Informe al pueblo de Ponce y al Gobernador de Puerto Rico sobre las gestiones administrativas y el estado de la Hacienda municipal durante el año económico de 1905 a 1906 por el alcalde de la ciudad. Ponce, Puerto Rico: Tipografía de El Ideal Católico. 1906. (Archivo Histórico Municipal de Ponce)
 Fay Fowlie de Flores. Ponce, Perla del Sur: Una Bibliográfica Anotada. Second Edition. 1997. Ponce, Puerto Rico: Universidad de Puerto Rico en Ponce. p. 332. Item 1655. 
 Ponce. Oficina del Alcalde. Al pueblo de Ponce y el Hon. Gobernador de Puerto Rico. Tipografía Baldorioty. 1902-1906. (Universidad de Puerto Rico - Rio Piedras.)

Mayors of Ponce, Puerto Rico
1869 births
1930s deaths
Year of death uncertain